William H. Allen (1851 – ?) was a farmer, magistrate, and state legislator in Mississippi. He served in the Mississippi House of Representatives from 1884–1887.
He was born in Jackson, Mississippi. He was a Methodist. He was a Republican.

See also
 African-American officeholders during and following the Reconstruction era

References

1851 births
Year of death missing